D417 branches off to the north from D2 at the eastern end of Osijek bypass towards Port of Osijek and to the eastern parts of the city of Osijek and to Nemetin.

The road, as well as all other state roads in Croatia, is managed and maintained by Hrvatske ceste, state owned company.

Road junctions and populated areas

Sources

State roads in Croatia
Osijek-Baranja County